Asthenotricha barnsae is a moth in the family Geometridae first described by Louis Beethoven Prout in 1935. It is found in the Democratic Republic of the Congo, Kenya and Uganda.

References

Moths described in 1935
Asthenotricha
Moths of Africa